The Goldbach is a river of Saxony-Anhalt, Germany.

Course
The Goldbach rises east of the uplands of Elbingerode. There are three major headwaters. The longer one, traditionally called Teufelsbach (Devil's Beck) is defined as the upper course, hydrographically. The other one, starting from a spring called Eggeröder Brunnen, traditionally is called Klostergrundbach (Covent Dale Beck) or Goldbach. The third major headwater is the Silberborn or Mönchsbach in Silberborn Valley, passing beneath Michaelstein Abbey. Their confluence is near Mönchemühle (Monks' Mill) in Blankenburg. In spring, the headwaters of the Goldbach can become raging meltwater torrents.

The stream passes under the B 6 federal highway and is joined by some other streams. In the forelands of Harz Mountains, it passes Langenstein and flows below the Spiegelsberge hills through the southern outskirts of Halberstadt. Than it passes through the center of Harsleben and reaches Wegeleben, where it discharges into River Bode.

Fauna
Numerous endangered species live in the Goldbach, such as the brown trout and small shellfish.

Tributaries
 Molkegraben (right)
 Sauteichsgraben (left)

See also
List of rivers of Saxony-Anhalt

References

External links
 The Goldbach in the Harz 

Rivers of Saxony-Anhalt
Rivers of Germany